The British Columbia Medal of Good Citizenship is an honorary medal produced by the Canadian province of British Columbia.  It was established by the Government of British Columbia in 2015 to recognize people who "acted in a particularly generous, kind or selfless manner for the common good without expectation of reward".  It is modelled after the Ontario Medal for Good Citizenship.

Recipients of the medal must be Canadian citizen, and current or former long-term residents of British Columbia.  Judges and elected federal, provincial or municipal representative are not eligible for nomination while such person remains in office.

Recipients of the medal are entitled to use the postnominal letters M.G.C. The medal is not part of the Canadian honours system and therefore cannot be worn on the left side of the chest with medals that are part of the Canadian Honours system and should be worn on the right side.

See also
List of Canadian awards
List of Canadian provincial and territorial orders
Sovereign's Medal for Volunteers
Ontario Medal for Good Citizenship
Saskatchewan Volunteer Medal

References

External links
 BC Medal of Good Citizenship

Provincial and territorial orders of Canada
British Columbia awards